Meeuwsen is a Dutch patronymic surname ("son of Mewis"). "Mewis" or "Meus" is a short form of Bartholomeus/Bartholomew. Notable people with the surname include:

Goos Meeuwsen (born 1982), Dutch clown
Mitch Meeuwsen (born 1982), American football player
Robert Meeuwsen (born 1988), Dutch beach volleyball player
Terry Meeuwsen (born 1949), American television personality

References

Dutch-language surnames
Patronymic surnames
Surnames from given names